Nowjeh Deh-e Sadat (also Romanized as Nowjeh Deh-e Sādāt, Nowjeh Deh Sādāt, and Nowjeh Deh-ye Sādāt; also known as Nagādi, Naqādi, and Nowjé Dehé Sadat) is a village in Mehranrud-e Markazi Rural District, in the Central District of Bostanabad County, East Azerbaijan Province, Iran. At the 2006 census, its population was 1,918, in 431 families.

References 

Populated places in Bostanabad County